Flow is the fourth full-length album by the Norwegian power metal/progressive metal band, Conception. Flow was released on 7 April 1997 by Noise Records.

Track listing

Personnel
All information from the album booklet.
Band members
 Roy Khan – vocals
 Tore Østby – guitar
 Ingar Amlien – bass
 Arve Heimdal – drums

Additional personnel
 Trond Nagell-dahl – keyboards
 Tommy Newton – producer, engineering
 Morten Hansen – photography, cover art
 Asgeir Mickelson – cover art

References

1997 albums
Conception (band) albums
Noise Records albums